ISO 3166-2:TF is the entry for the French Southern Territories (French Southern and Antarctic Lands) in ISO 3166-2, a part of the ISO 3166 standard which defines codes for the principal subdivisions of all countries included in ISO 3166-1. Currently, the entry does not include any codes.

The French Southern and Antarctic Lands is an overseas territorial collectivity of France and are officially assigned the ISO 3166-1 alpha-2 code . As an internal territory, it is also assigned the ISO 3166-2 code  under the entry for France.

Under the definition in ISO 3166-1, the French Southern and Antarctic Lands excludes Adélie Land, which is covered by Antarctica, with alpha-2 code .

See also
 Subdivisions of the French Southern Territories

External links
 ISO Online Browsing Platform: TF
 Districts of French Southern Territories, Statoids.com

2:TF
French Southern and Antarctic Lands